Claudia Tonn (born 18 April 1981 in Viernheim) is a German heptathlete. Her personal best result is 6373 points, achieved in June 2006 in Ratingen.

Achievements

References

1981 births
Living people
German heptathletes
Athletes (track and field) at the 2004 Summer Olympics
Olympic athletes of Germany
Sportspeople from Darmstadt (region)
20th-century German women
21st-century German women
People from Bergstraße (district)